Ayshea (born Ayshea Hague, 12 November 1948) is a British singer, actor and television presenter.

Biography
Born in Highgate, London, and educated at Arts Educational School, London, Ayshea was trained in ballet, music, drama and dance.  She made her film debut at the age of nine as an uncredited extra in the film, Tom Thumb (1958). At sixteen, she was signed to her first record label, for the Fontana label, who released her debut single, "Eeny Meeny" in 1965. She made appearances on television shows such as Thank Your Lucky Stars and Discotheque. Granada TV's producer Muriel Young hired Ayshea to host her own pop show, Lift Off with Ayshea in 1969. The series ran for 122 episodes lasting until 1974.

After being romantically linked with Steve Winwood, Chas Chandler and Rod Stewart, she married Cat Stevens' record producer, Chris Brough (the son of ventriloquist Peter Brough), who produced her records and was her manager.

Ayshea was a regular on quiz shows such as The Golden Shot and Celebrity Squares. As an actress, she appeared on Jason King and had a recurring role on UFO, the Gerry Anderson live-action series. After starring in pantomimes and summer shows all over the UK, Ayshea then built up a following for her live cabaret performances.

Ayshea and Chris Brough divorced in the 1970s. In 1975, she represented Great Britain at the World Popular Song Festival in Tokyo with a song written for her by Elton John, entitled "The Flowers Will Never Die". Following an engagement to Roy Wood, who wrote and produced her single "Farewell", she later married Steve Alder who had the lead role in the London stage production of the musical Jesus Christ Superstar.

Ayshea moved to Los Angeles and appeared in the movies Gotcha (1985) and Demolition Man (1993). Married to the CBS Sportsline founder, Mike Levy, Beverly Hills became her permanent home. For many years she ran a property development and interior design business.

In 2000, Ayshea moved back to the UK (in Grantham, Lincolnshire) to be close to her mother, Rose.

Discography

Albums
Ayshea (1970)
Lift Off with Ayshea (1974)

Singles
"Eeny Meeny / Keep My Love" (1965), Fontana
"Celebration of the Year / Only Love Can Save Me Now (1968), Polydor
"Another Night / Taking the Sun from My Eyes" (1969), Polydor
"Mister White's White Flying Machine / Ship of the Line" (1970), Polydor
"Who's Gonna Rescue Jesus? / Flowers Are Mine" (1970), Polydor
"Master Jack / Both Sides Now" (1971), RCA
"An Old Fashioned Love Song / The Family of Man" (1972), MAM
"Farewell / The Best Years of My Life" (1973), Harvest
"Another Without You Day / Moonbeam" (1974), DJM
"Don't Wait Till Tomorrow / Moonbeam" (1975), DJM
"The Flowers Will Never Die / The Best Years of My Life" (1975), DJM
"Golden Oldie / "Keep Me from Blowing Away (1977), DJM

References

External links

 
Lift Off with Ayshea – personal website

1948 births
Living people
People from Highgate
Singers from London
Actresses from London
English people of South Asian descent
English actresses of South Asian descent
English television presenters
English women pop singers